Cargills (Ceylon) PLC is a Sri Lankan Retail, FMCG, Banking and Restaurant company which is listed on the Colombo Stock Exchange. The controlling interest in the company is held by Ceylon Theatres PLC.

History
In 1844 British businessman William Milne started ‘Milne & Company', general warehousemen, importers of oilman stores etc,  with branches in Kandy and Galle. In 1850 Milne was joined by his friend, David Sime Cargill, and the firm became ‘Milne, Cargill & Co'. In 1860 Milne retired from business in Ceylon and moved back to Scotland to form a company in Glasgow to look after the business of Cargill & Co. in the UK. Cargill became the sole partner until he was joined by David MacKenzie and the name was changed to ‘Cargill & Co’. The company had a Colombo office at the intersection of Price and York Streets in Colombo Fort, a Kandy office at Upper Lake Road and an office in Galle Fort at 22 Pedlar Street. The Galle office was closed down in 1863.
In 1890 the business expanded with the purchase of 'Medical Hall,’ a chemist and druggist company. Cargills also established another company, ‘Sime & Co.’, which sold lower quality goods. In 1896 Cargill & Co. was converted into a Limited Liability Company registered in Glasgow. Two years later, the company bought James McLaren &Co.’s business in Nuwara Eliya, establishing a branch there.

Cargills - York Street

The iconic Cargills building in the centre of Colombo Fort was originally the residence of Captain Pieter Sluysken, the former Dutch military commander of Galle. It was subsequently occupied by the first British Governor of Ceylon, Sir Frederick North, who lived there for a short time before moving to a spacious villa in Hulftsdorp. The building was acquired by Cargills in 1896, while D.S. Cargill was Chairman, Walter Hamilton the Director and William Jenkins was General Manager. Construction of the current building commenced in 1902, it was designed by Edward Skinner, built by Walker Sons and Company and completed in 1906. A foundation stone dated 1684 and a wooden statue of Minerva (Roman goddess of wisdom, arts and trade), both retrieved from the gable end of Sluysken's house, are preserved by the ground floor lift. By 1909 employed "an executive staff of 32 Europeans and 600 hands."

Following a successful bid by Sir Chittampalam A. Gardiner, the business was incorporated as a Public limited company on 1 March 1946.

In 1981 Ceylon Theatres acquired a controlling interest in the company and Albert A. Page was appointed the Managing Director. Page went on to become the Chairman of Cargills on 26 November 1982.

Under the new management, Cargills explored the potential of innovating on its trading legacy. As a result, in 1983 Cargills established the first supermarket chain in Sri Lanka with the opening of its first outlet at Staple Street.

Cargills ventured into the production of processed meats in 1993 when the Company invested in its first manufacturing facility, Cargills Quality Foods, in Mattakkuliya. In 1996 Cargills acquired the franchise license for KFC and innovated on its secret recipe to deliver products that suited the local palate.

Cargills began sourcing fruits and vegetables directly from farmers in 1999 when it established its first collection centre in Hanguranketha. In 2002 it invested in a dairy processing plant and thereby expanded its outgrowing network to include dairy farmers. Cargills Magic ice cream was the outcome of this endeavour. In the same year, Cargills diversified into agri-processing with Cargills Kist which created further market opportunities for farmers.

In 2008 Cargills acquired Millers Limited consolidating its marketing and distribution operation.

In 2010 Cargills undertook an aggressive expansion plan in the FMCG sector to ride the growth potential of a growing economy. During that year the Company expanded its interests in the dairy sector by acquiring Kotmale Holdings PLC and entered another growing category with the acquisition of Diana Biscuits now marketed under the Kist brand.

In 2011, Cargills entered the soft alcohol industry by completing the acquisition of the McCallum Brewery and its brands. In the same year, the Company secured a provisional commercial banking license from the Central Bank of Sri Lanka.

Cargills acquired the franchise license for T.G.I. Friday's and opened its first restaurant at Colombo Fort in October 2013. In April 2014 Cargills Bank commenced business operations and in the same year, the Cargills Group kickstarted a restructuring initiative that saw Cargills exiting the soft alcohol business. As part of this restructuring, Cargills entered into an agreement with the International Finance Corporation (IFC) for equity investment into the Cargills retail sector

Industrial sectors

Banking
Cargills Bank - Provisional license were issued to operate a bank in September 2011. Cargills Bank received its licence to operate domestic and offshore banking business on 21 January 2014 and was ceremonially opened on 30 June 2014.

Modern Retailing
Cargills is involved in retailing goods through the following brands:
 Cargills Big City- Hypermarket
 Cargills Book City- Book Shops
 Cargills Express - Convenience Stores
 Cargills Food City - approximately 407 outlets
 Cargills Home

Food Manufacturing
Cargills is involved in food manufacturing through the following sub brands:
 Cargills Finest
 Cargills Kist
 Cargills Magic
 Cargills Lanka Milk
 Kotmale
 Milca
 Supremo

Restaurant
KFC Sri Lanka
T.G.I. Fridays Sri Lanka

Agri Business
Cargills Agri Business model

Distribution
Millers Distributors

References

External links
 Official Website

1844 establishments in Ceylon
Companies listed on the Colombo Stock Exchange
Food and drink companies of Sri Lanka
Supermarkets of Sri Lanka
Retail companies established in 1844
Retail companies of Sri Lanka
Sri Lankan brands